The Roman Catholic Archdiocese of Bossangoa is a diocese in Bossangoa in the Ecclesiastical province of Bangui in the Central African Republic.

History
 February 9, 1959: Established as Apostolic Prefecture of Bossangoa from the Diocese of Berbérati
 January 16, 1964: Promoted as Diocese of Bossangoa

Bishops

Ordinaries, in reverse chronological order

 Bishops of Bossangoa (Roman rite), below
 Bishop Nestor-Désiré Nongo-Aziagbia, S.M.A. (since May 14, 2012)
 Bishop François-Xavier Yombandje (April 3, 2004  – May 16, 2009)
 Bishop Paulin Pomodimo (June 10, 1995  – July 26, 2003), appointed Archbishop of Bangiu
 Bishop Sergio Adolfo Govi, O.F.M. Cap. (April 22, 1978  – June 10, 1995)
 Bishop Léon-Toussaint-Jean-Clément Chambon, O.F.M. Cap. (January 16, 1964  – April 22, 1978); see below
 Prefect Apostolic of Bossangoa (Roman rite), below 
 Father Léon-Toussaint-Jean-Clément Chambon, O.F.M. Cap. (December 14, 1959  – January 16, 1964); see above

Coadjutor bishop
Sergio Adolfo Govi, O.F.M. Cap. (1975-1978)

Auxiliary bishop
Edouard Mathos (1987-1991), appointed Auxiliary Bishop of Bangui

See also
Roman Catholicism in the Central African Republic

Sources
 GCatholic.org

Bossangoa
Bossangoa
Christian organizations established in 1959
Roman Catholic dioceses and prelatures established in the 20th century
Ouham